Transport in Copenhagen and the surrounding area relies on a well established infrastructure making it a hub in Northern Europe thanks to its road and rail networks as well as its international airport. Thanks to its many cycle tracks, Copenhagen is considered to be one of the world's most bicycle-friendly cities. The metro and S-train systems are key features of the city's well-developed public transport facilities. Since July 2000, the Øresund Bridge has served as a road and rail link to Malmö in Sweden. The city is also served by ferry connections to Oslo in Norway while its award-winning harbour is an ever more popular port of call for cruise ships.

Roads

Copenhagen has a large network of toll-free motorways and public roads connecting different municipalities of the city together and to Northern Europe. As in many other cities in Europe traffic is increasing in Copenhagen. The radial arterial roads leading to Copenhagen city centre are critically congested during peak hours.

In October 2011, heated, political talks of plans about road tolls around Copenhagen in order to combat the car congestion and improve the air quality arose. Discussions were abandoned in February 2012 due to disagreement of the physical locations of the toll road boundaries and political deadlock.

Cycling

Copenhagen is known as one of the most bicycle-friendly cities in the world. Every day 1.1 million km are bicycled in Copenhagen.  45% of all citizens commute to work, school or university by bicycle and it is municipal policy that this number should have gone up to 40% by 2012 and to 50% in 2015. The city's bicycle paths and cycle tracks are extensive and well used. Bicycle paths are often separated from the main traffic lanes and sometimes have their own signal systems, giving the cyclists a lead of a couple of seconds to accelerate.

The municipality is also developing a system of interconnected green bicycle routes, greenways, the aim being to facilitate fast, safe, and pleasant bicycle transport from one end of the city to the other. The city provides public bicycles which can be found throughout the downtown area.

Copenhagen's well-developed bicycle culture is reflected in the use of copenhagenise to describe the practice of other cities adopting Copenhagen-style bike lanes and bicycle infrastructure. In 2007, Copenhagen-based Danish urban design consultant Jan Gehl was hired by the New York City Department of Transportation to re-imagine New York City streets by introducing designs to improve life for pedestrians and cyclists. In recognition of Copenhagen's emphasis on bicycling, the city was chosen by the Union Cycliste Internationale as their first official Bike City. Bike City Copenhagen took place from 2008 to 2011 and consisted of large cycling events for professionals as well as amateurs, culminating in the 2011 UCI Road World Championships.

Public transportation

Copenhagen Metro is a 24/7 rapid transit system serving Copenhagen, Frederiksberg and Tårnby in Denmark. The  system opened between 2002 and 2007, and 2019 and 2020, and has four lines, M1 M2, M3, and M4. The AnsaldoBreda Driverless Metro cars supplements the larger S-train rapid transit system, and is integrated with DSB local trains and Movia buses. Through the city center and west to Frederiksberg, M1 and M2 share a common line. To the south-east, the system serves Amager, with the  M1 running through the new neighborhood of Ørestad, and the  M2 serving the eastern neighborhoods and Copenhagen Airport. The City Circle Line or M3, an expansion of the Copenhagen Metro, was opened in 2019. The Nordhavn branch of the M4 line opened in 2020, with the Sydhavn branch due to be open in 2024. The Metro currently has 35 stations, 13 of which are above ground. In 2011, the Metro carried 54.3 million  passengers. A separate metro line, Øresundsmetro, connecting Copenhagen with Malmö is being considered.

The S-train network is a metrolike urban rapid transit network mainly serving the urban Copenhagen area. It connects the city centre and inner boroughs with the outer boroughs of Copenhagen. The system has four main lines, and their tracks are fully separated from all other traffic. Parts are elevated, other parts run in cuttings, and the central section (the Boulevard Line) is largely underground. Each line operates at a frequency of six trains per hour throughout the day. Through the city centre, however, where three of the four lines converge, trains can be as often as every two or three minutes. The fourth line, Ringbanen, takes another path through the city and has an operating frequency of 12 trains per hour. Some notable S-Train stations in central Copenhagen are Central Station (served by M3 and M4 metro lines), Valby, Nørreport (served by M1 and M2), Østerport (M3, M4), Nordhavn (M4) and the typical junctions Ny Ellebjerg (M4 metro station opening in 2024), Danshøj, Flintholm (M1, M2), Ryparken, Svanemøllen and Hellerup. The S-train system is the main rail transport within the wider Copenhagen area. In the 1990s it was decided to complement the S-Trains with a Metro system.

Regional trains
The regional trains are equally important for transport within the Metropolitan Area of Copenhagen. Important lines are for instance along Kystbanen (The Coast line) to Helsingør (Shakespeare's Elsinore with Kronborg Castle), to Copenhagen Airport, and to Roskilde. If the S-Train runs parallel, the distances between regional train stations are longer than where only regional trains are available. The regional trains also run outside the Metropolitan area (which also equals the ticket system area for all public traffic within Copenhagen). For travel outside this area, a different type of ticket must be purchased. The regional trains continues to western and southern Zealand as well as to the islands Falster and Lolland. Labeled as Øresundstog, they continue to Scania and some other Swedish provinces. The Copenhagen-Ringsted Line was inaugurated in May 2019.

Local trains
There are also three different system of local trains in the northern and southernmost suburbs. These run on unelectrified tracks, and are not available in the central parts of the city. Most local train lines begin at stations where S-train or regional trains end. The local trains are included in the ticket system of the Metropolitan area, with most being part of the R-net. A network of regional trains and bus trunk routes, both running at 30 minute frequencies.

Trams
Between 1863-1972 Copenhagen had an excellent tram network. At its most extensive, the network had more than twenty lines.

Light rail
A planned light rail connecting the outer suburbs is expected to become operational in 2025.

Buses

Greater Copenhagen is connected by a vast system of various different bus services and types of such, managed by the regional bus agency Movia, who manage bus routes across all of Region Hovedstaden and Region Sjælland (excluding the Isle of Bornholm). These include:

A-buses (in red): Trunk routes with a 7.5 minute frequency or higher and all door boarding. These routes also operate 24/7 in Copenhagen. These include:

1A (Hellerup-Trianglen-Rigshospitalet-HC Ørsteds Vej-Enghave Plads-Hvidovre Hospital-Avedøre)

2A (Refshaleøen-Christianshavn-Copenhagen Central-Forum-Godthåbsvej-Brønshøj Torv-Tingbjerg)

4A (Friheden-Ny Ellebjerg/Copenhagen South-Valby-Fasanvej-Nørrebro-Emdrup Torv-Gladsaxe-Buddinge)

6A (Nørreport-Rigshospitalet-Bispebjerg-Emdrup Torv-Søborg-Buddinge)

7A (Ny Ellebjerg/Copenhagen South-Sydhavn-Copenhagen Central-Vesterbro-Frederiksberg Alle-Roskildevej/Zoo-Rødovre Centrum-Rødovrehallen)

9A (Glostrup-Rødovrehallen-Jyllingevej-Vanløse-Flintholm-Peter Bangs vej/Gl. Kongevej-Frederiksberg Alle-Carlsberg-Mozarts plads-Kongens Enghave Valbyparken)

Many larger towns outside of Copenhagen also feature A-bus routes. These operate at 15 minute frequencies, don't operate at night and don't allow all door boarding. These can be found in:

Helsingør

Roskilde

Køge

Holbæk

Næstved

Ringsted

C-buses/Cityline (turqoise with yellow corners): Trunk routes with increased priority in traffic, and 4 minute frequencies or higher, and night service. Features all door boarding and all stops feature Cityline branding. This route branding is intended by Movia to be for routes applying their BRT-inspired "+way" infrastructure along large stretches. Only one Cityline route exists, this being:

5C (Herlev Hospital-Husum-Brønshøj-Bellahøj-Nørrebro-Nørreport-Copenhagen Central-Amagerbro-Sundbyvester Plads-Den Blå Planet (national aquarium)-Copenhagen Airport). This route is the busiest in the city with 17.777.741 annual passengers (2019).

S-buses (in Blue): Fast Rapid routes with limited stops and frequencies of every 15 minutes or higher. Some of the routes, but not all operate during the night. The numbers ending on x00S are circumferential, while the routes ending in x50S are radial routes. These include:

150S (Nørreport-Rigshospitalet-Vibenhus Runddel-Ryparken-Elsinore Highway/DTU-Nærum-Gl. Holte-Hørsholm-Kokkedal)

200S (Buddinge-Gladsaxe-Husum-Rødovre-Hvidovre Hospital-Friheden)

250S (Bagsværd-Gladsaxe-Bellahøj-Nørrebro-Forum-Copenhagen Central-Amagerbro-Sundbyvester Plads-Tårnby-Dragør)

300S (Nærum-Lundtofte-Lyngby-Buddinge-Gladsaxe-Herlev-Glostrup-Vallensbæk-Ishøj)(This route will close in 2025 and be replaced by the under construction Light rail line on the same route)

350S (Ballerup-Lautrupparken-Herlev-Husum-Brønshøj-Bellahøj-Nørrebro-Nørreport)

400S (Lyngby-Bagsværd-Ballerup-Høje Taastrup-Hundige)

500S (Kokkedal-Birkerød-Farum-Værløse-Ballerup-Glostrup-Brøndby Strand-Avedøre Holme-Ørestad)

600S (Hillerød-Slangerup-Ølstykke-Jyllinge-Roskilde-Tune-Hundige)

E-buses (in green): Express buses with limited schedules. Denoted with an E- on the end.

R-buses (in blue): Operates in rural regions, often alongside local trains as part of the R-net. A network of transit trunk corridors outside of the city with 30 minute frequencies throughout the daytime hours.

N-buses (grey on signs): Night buses. Denoted with an N- on the end

Ordinary-buses Typically all yellow. The service quality and frequency depends widely from line to line, from as frequent to every 10 minutes, to only a few departures a day.

BRT

Copenhagen already has one 2.5 kilometer long busway between Ryparken station and the lakes just past Rigshospitalet known as "Den Kvikke vej" (The Smart street). This busway opened in 2014 and is used by lines 6A, 15E, 150S, 184, 185 and 94N, featuring signal priority, median buslanes, and stops with a raised curb to make boarding easier.

Additionally 2 full scale BRT projects have been approved in the suburbs of Copenhagen. Specifically to upgrade lines 200S and 400S to full BRT with dedicated (mostly median) bus lanes along almost the entire corridor, a dedicated BRT service with larger than average buses, and upgraded station-like stops. It’s projected that these upgrades will make the lines significantly faster, in the case of 400S, 15 minutes faster between Lyngby and Ishøj. Additionally these upgrades will also include some changes to the routes, like routing the 400S BRT through Lautrupparken, Copenhagen's largest businesspark, and past Malmparken station on the S-train network. These infrastructure works are slated to begin in 2026 for both lines.

Additionally additional BRT studies and other bus improvement projects under Movia's "+way" umbrella are being done in the Greater Copenhagen area, including:

Studies for BRT and/or Light rail for the corridor Gladsaxe Trafikplads-Tingbjerg-Husum-Brønshøj-Bellahøj-Nørrebro (currently undecided)

BRT for line 150S (not granted funding)

+way for line 150S (currently not decided)

+way for line 500S for the corridor Brøndby Stadion-Brøndby Strand-Avedøre Holme (approved, finished by 2024)

Additionally Movia has published reports for several large towns and their local governments around the region for Bus improvements, using the same design language as their BRT projects.

City Pass, central Copenhagen urban transit stations 
The one figured ticket fare zones 1-4 constitutes an area known as the "City Pass" area. A City Pass is a ticket valid for all public transport within the City Pass area and can be purchased for a duration of 24, 48, 72 or 120 hours (1,2,3 or 5 days). From summer of 2019 (as the Circular line of the Metro, M3, and a smaller part of the Harbour line, M4, opens) there will be a total of 64 urban transit stations within the City Pass area. By type(s) of rail transport there will be:

 30 stations with Metro service only.
 21 stations with S-trains only.
 1 station with Regional train service only.
 4 stations with Metro and S-train (but no Regional train) service.
 3 stations with S-train and Regional train (but no Metro) service.
 2 stations with Metro and Regional train (but no S-train) service.
 3 stations with Metro, S-train and Regional train service.
 Tally: 64 stations.

Another 5 Metro stations of the Harbour line (M4) are under construction and are scheduled to open in 2024. In the opposite end of that line (in the North), is an extension planned, but not decided. Still many attractions and inner city boroughs will still lack a nearby station, like Copenhagen Zoo, Copenhagen Opera and old block build districts like Hellerup, Brønshøj, and the densely populated Inner Nørrebro as well as the national hospital Rigshospitalet.

Domestic and international trains

Copenhagen Central Station provides Copenhagen with Intercity and Express trains across Denmark, as well as services to several international destinations. Re-tog regional trains (stops at major stations within the Greater Copenhagen area) connect the main parts of Zealand to the capital. Intercity trains run half-hourly from Copenhagen during daytime and serve as a link between the major cities and towns in Denmark, including Aarhus, Odense, Aalborg, Esbjerg, Randers, Kolding, Horsens,  and Roskilde - the 10 biggest cities outside Copenhagen. Direct international trains connect to Stockholm, Hamburg and Berlin several times a day, and a EuroNight train served destinations as far as Prague, Amsterdam and Basel, but closed in November, 2014. Trains to southern and western Sweden depart every 20 minutes. (A special ticket fare system exists between the Copenhagen local traffic area and the most southern part of Sweden, Skåne county.)

Tickets

There are 193 rail stations where most of them have connecting bus services. This link shows all lines, stations and fare zones. The Copenhagen local traffic area is divided in 95 zones. Zones 1, 2 and 3 make up the city core of Copenhagen.
The same ticket is valid for travel on bus, train, and metro networks. Ticket machines are installed at all stations, and tickets can also be bought on buses and at ticket counters located at major stations. A ticket price inside the Copenhagen local traffic area is distance-dependent and always between two and nine zones (a nine zone ticket goes for all zones). The fine for not having a valid ticket is 750DKK.

Rejsekortet (lit. "the travel card") is an electronic ticket system for Danish public transport. The system is a collaborative work between DSB, HUR, Ørestadsselskabet, and various regional bus companies. It is similar to the Oyster card used in Greater London in England. The system will replace the current zone ticket system. Instead, fares will be calculated from the distance made from the beginning of the journey to the end, as the crow flies, so as to give a better correlation between price and distance travelled. However, technical difficulties have been reported on equipment not registering properly and people forgetting to check out after completion of their journey. Online user-friendliness and customer service have also taken criticism.

Airports

Copenhagen Airport, officially, Copenhagen Airport, Kastrup is the main airport serving Copenhagen. It is the largest in Scandinavia and the 17th largest in Europe. Located in Kastrup on the island of Amager, it has efficient connections to downtown Copenhagen via metro and regional trains. Its location also makes it the most important international airport for large parts of southern Sweden. Copenhagen Airport is a major hub for SAS and Norwegian, and along with around 60 other airlines, it offers frequent flights to most major cities throughout Europe, as well as intercontinental flights to the United States, China, Thailand, northern Africa and United Arab Emirates.

It is primarily used for general aviation traffic, flight schools, business jets and occasional charter flights, but can be used by medium jets - although not always at full take-off weight. Plans for expanding Roskilde Airport have been approved, making it more suitable for regular flights of medium jets, such as those operated by most low-cost airlines and charter operators. However, a lack of firm commitment from airlines has postponed the expansion indefinitely.

A seaplane operates 4 times daily between Copenhagen harbour and Aarhus harbour.

Harbour

Copenhagen has four lines of waterbuses, known as the Copenhagen Harbour Buses, serving ten water bus stops; four on the Amager-side and six on the Zealand-side of the harbour, from Sluseholmen in the South to Holmen in the North.

Copenhagen is served by ferry lines to Oslo in Norway (called "Oslobåden") with a daily connection. There is a ferry from Køge to Bornholm or alternatively by train to Ystad with connection to fast ferry to Bornholm.

The harbour of Copenhagen has largely lost its industrial importance. In 2001, Copenhagen Harbour as an organisation merged with the harbour in Malmö to create Copenhagen-Malmö Port. It has several functions, the most important being as a major cruise destination. In 2007 a record 286 cruise ships with 420,000 cruise passengers visited Copenhagen. 120 of these ships either started or ended the cruise in Copenhagen. In 2012 these numbers grew further to 372 cruise ships and 840,000 passengers.  As a result of the growth in the cruise industry facilities are being expanded and improved. At the World Travel Awards in 2012, Copenhagen Port was once again named Europe's leading cruise port after receiving the award every year since 2008.

Intercity bus
Copenhagen does not have an intercity bus terminal.  Most national and international buses that run through the central city have their main stop in Copenhagen at Ingerslevsgade, adjacent to the DGI-byen complex near Copenhagen Central Station.  These include buses for Nettbuss express, Swebus Express, Flixbus and Eurolines.

References